"Shorty Wanna Ride" is the second single from Young Buck's first album, Straight Outta Cashville.

Background
"Shorty Wanna Ride" was released in late 2004. The song debuted at number 68 on the Billboard Hot 100 and peaked at number 17 on the chart, becoming Young Buck's highest charting single. The song was produced by Jonathan "Lil Jon" Smith.

Music video
The video was inspired by the film Natural Born Killers. Actress Malinda Williams stars in this video as Young Buck's love interest. Pauly Shore also makes a cameo appearance in this video as a news reporter. At the end of the video, the song "Stomp" is briefly played. The Game (who has verse in the song) makes a cameo appearance in the video. 50 Cent and Olivia also have cameo appearances in the video.

Charts

Weekly charts

Year-end charts

Release history

References

External links 
 

2004 songs
2004 singles
Young Buck songs
Music videos directed by Gil Green
Song recordings produced by Lil Jon
Songs written by Young Buck
Songs written by Lil Jon
Songs written by Craig Love
G-Unit Records singles
Crunk songs